Puzhou or Pu Prefecture was a zhou (prefecture) in imperial China, centering on modern Anyue County, Sichuan, China. It existed (intermittently) from 575 until 1376.

Geography
The administrative region of Pu Prefecture in the Song dynasty is in modern eastern Sichuan, which borders Chongqing. It probably includes parts of modern: 
Under the administration of Ziyang:
Anyue County
Lezhi County
Under the administration of Suining:
Suining

See also
Anyue Commandery

References
 

Prefectures of the Sui dynasty
Prefectures of the Tang dynasty
Prefectures of the Song dynasty
Prefectures of Former Shu
Prefectures of Later Shu
Prefectures of Later Tang
Former prefectures in Sichuan
Subprefectures of the Ming dynasty